The Hebrew Christian Prayer Union may refer to two Hebrew Christian organizations:

 Hebrew Christian Prayer Union of London,  founded by Henry Aaron Stern in 1882, included into the Hebrew Christian Alliance of Great Britain.
 The Hebrew Christian Prayer Union (America), informally organised 1813 under the sponsorship of the Rev. Philip Milledoler of the Reformed Dutch Church, incorporated 1820-1867 American Society for Meliorating the Condition of the Jews, then wound up. Now included into the Hebrew Christian Alliance of America.

Hebrew Christian movement